People awarded the Honorary citizenship of the City of Sarajevo, Bosnia and Herzegovina are:

Honorary Citizens of Sarajevo
Listed by date of award:

References

Sarajevo-related lists
Sarajevo
Bosnia and Herzegovina awards